The Château de Beauregard is an historic château in Seyssinet-Pariset, Isère, France. It was built in the 18th century. It has been listed as an official historical monument since December 15, 1997.

References

Houses completed in the 18th century
Châteaux in Isère
Monuments historiques of Isère
18th-century architecture in France